Cussewago may refer to:

Cussewago Creek, a stream in Pennsylvania
Cussewago Township, Crawford County, Pennsylvania